Henning Solberg (born 8 January 1973) is a Norwegian rally and rallycross driver. Together with his female co-driver Ilka Minor, he currently competes in the World Rally Championship (WRC) with cars of M-Sport.

Solberg is the older brother of the 2003 FIA World Rally Champion Petter Solberg and through his Swedish spouse Maud the stepfather of Swedish rally driver Pontus Tidemand.

Career

Henning Solberg was born in Askim, but grew up in Spydeberg. Like his younger brother Petter, Henning started his career as a driver in bilcross (Norwegian low-budget rallycross similar to Swedish folkrace and Finnish jokamiehenluokka) and rallycross events, and switched completely to rallying in the mid-1990s. Between 1999 and 2003, he became the Norwegian Rally Champion for five years in a row.

After several events as a privateer in the WRC, Solberg got a contract with Bozian Racing for the 2004 season. At his first event with the Peugeot 206 WRC, the 2004 Swedish Rally, Solberg took his first WRC points by driving to sixth place. This remained his best result and only points-finish of the season.

For the 2005 season, Solberg was signed by the BP Ford World Rally Team, Ford's factory WRC team. He competed in seven rounds alongside Ford's main drivers Toni Gardemeister and Roman Kresta. His best result came at the Cyprus Rally, where he beat team-mates Gardemeister and Kresta to the fourth place. With nine points, Solberg finished 14th in the drivers' world championship.

OMV Peugeot Norway WRT (2006)

In 2006, Solberg partnered Manfred Stohl at the OMV Peugeot Norway W.R.T., and drove the Peugeot 307 WRC in 12 of the 16 WRC rounds plus the non-WRC event Rally Norway. He achieved his first ever podium finish coming in third in the Rally of Turkey. With six other points-scoring positions to his name, he finished eighth in the drivers' standings. Solberg also appeared in an edition of the BBC show Top Gear, where he rallied a Mitsubishi Lancer Evolution in a downhill snow track in a race against the Norwegian bobsleigh team at Lillehammer.  The Lillehammer Olympic Bobsleigh and Luge Track is 1365 meters long with 16 turns and an 8.5% average grade and Solberg's route was equally challenging.  With Top Gear presenter James May as his "co-driver," Solberg made it 1:02:24 in the Evo while the bobsled (with presenter Richard Hammond in it) beat Solberg with a time of 59:68.

Stobart Ford (2007–2011)

For 2007, Solberg was given a full-time drive with the Stobart VK M-Sport Ford Rally Team. He achieved his second podium finish in the World Rally Championship by driving his Ford Focus RS WRC 06 to third place at his home event, the 2007 Rally Norway, when the rally was part of the WRC calendar for the first time. He later took his career third podium finish at the 2007 Rally Japan, and finished sixth in the drivers' championship, ahead of Subaru's Chris Atkinson and his young team-mate Jari-Matti Latvala.

Solberg retained his place at the Stobart team for the 2008 season. In Sweden he was on course for a podium finish before a puncture and a crash on the second day put him out of the points. For México Solberg was nominated to score points for the Munchi's team. He achieved a fifth-place finish despite suffering two punctures. In the series' first-ever Jordan Rally, he recorded his best result of the season by finishing fourth. After five more points-scoring finishes were followed by five rallies with no points, Solberg finished eighth overall in the drivers' standings. At the 2008 Mountain Rally Norway, the first round in the 2008 Norwegian Rally Championship, Henning took first in his class driving a Ford Fiesta ST N3.

In 2009, Solberg had his career-best start to the season. He drove his Focus RS WRC 08 to fourth place both in the season-opening Rally Ireland and the following Rally Norway. After a road accident ended his chances in Cyprus, he finished fifth in Portugal and took his career fourth podium place in Argentina, behind the Citroën duo Sébastien Loeb and Dani Sordo. He achieved another podium in Poland.

In 2010 Solberg was driving Ford Focus RS WRC 08 at first 6 events but at 2010 Rally Bulgaria he drove a Ford Fiesta S2000. At 2010 Rally Finland, 2010 Rallye Deutschland and 2010 Rally Japan he drove Ford Focus RS WRC 08 again. At last two rallies he drove Ford Fiesta S2000. His co-driver is Ilka Minor, but during her injury was his co-driver Stéphane Prévot. Every time Solberg participated in WRC with a S2000 car he scored points and beat a few WRC drivers.

Go Fast Energy World Rally Team (2012)
Henning Solberg competed for the privateer Go Fast Energy World Rally Team along with Matthew Wilson in the first half of the 2012 season. In Monte Carlo, due to various issues, he finished outside the top ten. Henning could retaliate on the next round in Sweden, finishing in 7th place. After that, the whole Go Fast team disappeared as a whole.

2013-present
Solberg made his return to the WRC on the 2013 World Rally Championship's second round, Rally Sweden, after a one-year hiatus. His co-driver was Emil Axelsson, and used M-Sport's Fiesta RS WRC. The car sported a full white design without any sponsors, although they later put up "Can you watch this space?" stickers to cover the space on the sides and the hood. The pairing finished 8th, after a 4m20s time penalty. Solberg stated in a stage-end interview that he's working to find funds for a programme, but nothing is certain yet.

Racing record

Complete WRC results

WRC-2 results

Complete FIA European Rallycross Championship results

Division 1*

* ''Division 1 was rebranded as Division 2 in 1997.

Division 1

Supercar

Complete FIA World Rallycross Championship results

Supercar

References

External links

WRC Archive stat page
Results at ewrc-results.com
Henning Solberg at the Stobart Motorsport

1973 births
Living people
Norwegian rally drivers
World Rally Championship drivers
Intercontinental Rally Challenge drivers
European Rallycross Championship drivers
World Rallycross Championship drivers
Global RallyCross Championship drivers
People from Askim
People from Spydeberg
Sportspeople from Viken (county)
Toksport WRT drivers
M-Sport drivers